Yongchu may refer to:

Yeongju, a city in North Gyeongsang, South Korea

Historical eras
Yongchu (107–113), era name used by Emperor An of Han
Yongchu (420–422), era name used by Emperor Wu of Liu Song